Imreish is a Palestinian village located eleven kilometers south-west of Hebron. The village is in the Hebron Governorate in the southern West Bank. According to the Palestinian Central Bureau of Statistics, the village had a population of 1,665 in 2007. The primary health care facilities for the village are designated by the Ministry of Health as level 1.

Footnotes

External links
Survey of Western Palestine, Map 21:    IAA, Wikimedia commons
Imreish Village (Fact Sheet), Applied Research Institute–Jerusalem, ARIJ
Imreish Village Profile, ARIJ
 Imreish Village Area Photo, ARIJ
 The priorities and needs for development in Imreish village based on the community and local authorities’ assessment, ARIJ

Villages in the West Bank
Hebron Governorate
Municipalities of the State of Palestine